Oyster Creek is a rural locality in the Gladstone Region, Queensland, Australia.

Geography
The north branch of Baffle Creek forms the western boundary.

References 

Gladstone Region
Localities in Queensland